Getap or Getap' may refer to:
Getap, Aragatsotn, Armenia
Getap, Shirak, Armenia
Getap, Vayots Dzor, Armenia
 Getap (radio program), Argentine radio program